ERC Ingolstadt (Eishockey-und-Rollschuh club) is a German professional ice hockey club that plays in the Deutsche Eishockey Liga (DEL). Commonly known as the Panthers, the team plays its home games at the Saturn Arena in Ingolstadt.

History
ERC Ingolstadt was promoted to the Deutsche Eishockey Liga in 2002 after three consecutive years of playing in the championship finals of Germany's second-tier hockey league, the 2.Bundesliga.

During the 2004–05 NHL lockout, Ingolstadt signed National Hockey League (NHL) players Marco Sturm, Andy McDonald, Jamie Langenbrunner and Aaron Ward. Other well-known NHL alumni include goaltender Jimmy Waite, Yves Sarault, Patric Hörnqvist and Jason Holland.

In the 2008–09 season, the team took part in the famous Spengler Cup.

ERC Ingolstadt won its first and only DEL championship in 2014 as an overwhelming underdog entering the playoffs. After finishing in ninth place in the regular season, the Panthers knocked out the three-time defending league champions Eisbären Berlin in overtime of the final game of the playoff qualification round. In the first round of the playoffs, the team of head coach Niklas Sundblad then shocked second-seeded Krefeld Pinguine in five games and then eliminated Hamburg Freezers, who had finished the regular season in first place, in six games. In the championship final, Ingolstadt defeated Kölner Haie in seven games, with goaltender Timo Pielmeier recording a 27-save shutout in Game 7.

By virtue of winning the DEL championship, ERC Ingolstadt was invited to play in the 2014–15 Champions Hockey League.

Season records

Players

Current roster

Honors

Champions
Deutsche Eishockey Liga Championship: 2014
2.Bundesliga Championship: 2001

References

External links
 

 
Ice hockey teams in Germany
Sport in Ingolstadt
Ice hockey clubs established in 1964
1964 establishments in West Germany
Ice hockey teams in Bavaria